The 1991 World Weightlifting Championships were held in Donaueschingen, Germany from September 27 to October 6, 1991.

Medal summary

Men

Women

Medal table
Ranking by Big (Total result) medals 

Ranking by all medals: Big (Total result) and Small (Snatch and Clean & Jerk)

References
Results (Sport 123)
Weightlifting World Championships Seniors Statistics

External links
Database

W
World Weightlifting Championships
World Weightlifting Championships
International weightlifting competitions hosted by Germany